Alla Oleksiivna Starostina is a Ukrainian economist. She is a professor and heads the international economics and marketing department at Taras Shevchenko National University of Kyiv. Starostina was the head of the industrial marketing department at National Technical University of Ukraine from 1993 to 2002. 

Starostina graduated from Taras Shevchenko National University of Kyiv in 1976 with a degree in the political economy. In 1999, she defended her dissertation, Методологія і практика маркетингових досліджень в Україні.  

She received the State Prize of Ukraine in Science and Technology in 2011 for her marketing textbooks.

References 

Living people
Year of birth missing (living people)
Place of birth missing (living people)
Ukrainian women economists
21st-century  Ukrainian  economists
Taras Shevchenko National University of Kyiv alumni
Academic staff of the Taras Shevchenko National University of Kyiv
Academic staff of Kyiv Polytechnic Institute

20th-century  Ukrainian  economists